Raúl Sánchez Soler (born 1 December 1976) is a Spanish retired footballer who played as a striker.

His career was closely associated with Almería, after scoring a career-best 25 goals in the 2001–02 campaign.

Playing career
Sánchez was born in Almería, Andalusia. After graduating from local CD Oriente he joined CD San Isidro de Níjar, and appeared with the side in Tercera División. In the 1997 summer he moved to hometown's UD Almería, appearing regularly but suffering relegation from Segunda División B in the 1998–99 season.

In 1999 Sánchez moved to Real Balompédica Linense, also in the third level; a year later he moved back to Almería, scoring regularly and being promoted to Segunda División in 2002. In July 2002 he rejected a contract renewal and moved to UD Salamanca, also in the second level.

On 31 August 2002 Sánchez played his first match as a professional, starting in a 2–1 away success against his former club Almería, scoring his first goal on 9 February of the following year, netting the first of a 2–1 home win against the same team. He continued to appear in the second level in the following campaigns, representing CD Castellón, CD Tenerife and Deportivo Alavés.

On 8 August 2009 Sánchez joined Polideportivo Ejido in the third level, retiring at the end of the season, aged 33.

References

External links
 Tenerife official profile 
 
 

1976 births
Living people
Footballers from Almería
Spanish footballers
Association football forwards
Segunda División players
Segunda División B players
UD Almería players
Real Balompédica Linense footballers
UD Salamanca players
CD Castellón footballers
CD Tenerife players
Deportivo Alavés players
Polideportivo Ejido footballers